Nikolayevka is a rural locality (a selo) and the administrative center of Nikolayevsky Selsoviet, Pospelikhinsky District, Altai Krai, Russia. The population was 1,336 as of 2013. There are 12 streets.

Geography 
Nikolayevka is located 21 km southeast of Pospelikha (the district's administrative centre) by road. Gavrilovsky is the nearest rural locality.

References 

Rural localities in Pospelikhinsky District